Jane Doe is a placeholder name for a party whose true identity is unknown or must be otherwise withheld; especially if the unknown party is known, perceived or presumed to be female (a girl or woman).

Jane Doe may also refer to:

Film
 Jane Doe (2001 film), a 2001 American television film
 Jane Doe (film series), on the Hallmark cable channel
 The Autopsy of Jane Doe, a 2016 American supernatural horror film

Music
 Jane Doe (album), a 2001 album by the band Converge
 "Jane Doe", a bonus track by Dutch symphonic metal band Within Temptation on their album The Silent Force
 "Jane Doe", a song by Alicia Keys from the album Songs in A Minor
 "Jane Doe", a song by Nik Kershaw from the album To Be Frank
 "Jane Doe" (song), the debut single of AKB48's Minami Takahashi
"Jane Doe", a song by Never Shout Never from the album What Is Love?
"Jane Doe", a song by Korean girl group Ladies' Code from the 2016 album STRANG3R

Characters
 Ms. Jane Doe, a character on the cartoon series Camp Lazlo
 Jane Doe, a character in the MMORPG MapleStory
 Jane Doe, the name given to a character played by Jaimie Alexander in the TV series Blindspot
 Jane Doe (character), a DC Comics enemy of Batman
 Jane Doe, a character played by Jaimie Alexander in the musical Ride the Cyclone

See also
 John Doe (disambiguation)